Pembrey and Burry Port Town (Welsh: Pen-bre a Phorth Tywyn) is a community located in Carmarthenshire, Wales including the town of Burry Port and the village of Pembrey. The community population taken at the 2011 census was 8,547.

The community lies on the north-eastern shore of Carmarthen Bay. It is bordered by the communities of: Llansteffan; St Ishmael; Kidwelly; Trimsaran; and Llanelli Rural, all being in Carmarthenshire.

References

See also
Pembrey Circuit
Pembrey Airport
Court Farm, Pembrey

Communities in Carmarthenshire
Carmarthen Bay